Hadspen is a town on the South Esk River in the north of Tasmania, Australia,  south west of Launceston. Hadspen has few commercial establishments and is primarily a residential suburb of nearby Launceston. Most of the town's buildings are residential, and relatively recent. The town's population of just over 2000 has grown rapidly from only a few hundred in the 1960s, and there are development plans that call for its doubling.

Settlement began in the early 19th century as a cluster of houses on the Launceston side of the river, near a frequently-flooded ford. Over time various bridges were built, largely on the same site, across the river. Though it had been settled for some time Hadspen was only officially declared in 1866. Hadspen was originally on the main road from Launceston to Devonport but the town's centre was bypassed in the late 20th century.  There have been schools, both secular and religious, in its history, though there remain none.

The town has heritage-listed properties and some others from colonial times. The town's historic centrepiece is Entally House, built in 1819 as a wealthy settler's colonial estate. It was the former family home of Thomas Reibey, Premier of Tasmania from 1876 to 1877. The Red Feather Inn was built in the 1840s and remains in use as a restaurant and for accommodation. A gaol from the same time reflects Tasmania's convict past. The Uniting Church building dates back over 150 years, originally as a Wesleyan chapel, and the Anglican Church of the Good Shepherd is known for taking over ninety years to complete.

Geography
It is on the southern side of the South Esk River, near the confluence of the South Esk and Meander Rivers. The town is set in a rural landscape; Surrounding countryside contains valleys, river flood plains, remnant uncleared bush and undulating pastures. The majority of the town lies between the South Esk, and a low section of land east of the town called Beams Hollow, which is named after Thomas Beams, owner of a  lot through which the road from Launceston first ran.

History
As of 1831 there was a settlement named Hadspen near a ford of the South Esk River. A road was proposed from Launceston, crossing the river at this ford near Thomas Haydock Reibey's property of Entally.
The name may have been given by surveyor George Frankland after Hadspen house and garden, an estate in Somerset, England. By the 1840s Hadspen was a small cluster of houses near "Reibey's ford", and the river crossing was now on the main road from Launceston. 
Hadspen Post Office opened on 1 November 1849, though the town was not declared in the government gazette until January 1866. A bridge was constructed in the early 1840s replacing the often impassable ford, and during the next century the bridge was often repaired and sometimes replaced.

In early years there were two Hotels: Cricket Club Hotel near the river, which was partly destroyed by flood in the 1870s and subsequently demolished, and Hadspen Hotel, a convict-built sandstone structure.  By 1881 both had closed and there were no hotels in the town. An application to re-licence a building opposite the Wesleyan church was unsuccessful. The Hadspen Hotel was a private home in the early 20th century and remains as part of the town's heritage. None of these hotels are open in the 21st century, the Rutherglen complex on the town's west is the only licensed premises. There was a brewery in the town for a time, though it has long closed. The postal service from Hadspen originally was handled by a licensee operating from a shop, and subsequently from one of hotels. By 1966 the post office was in a separate building on the site of the former blacksmith's shop.

There was an early reference to churches in 1844 when the Examiner noted that Bishop Nixon "laid the foundation stone of a new church at Hadspen, Reibey's ford" though it is not stated which church. 
This church is likely to have been a small wooden one that was the first used by the Church of England. The then Reverend Thomas Reibey had a small stone chapel built at Entally in 1850. Though it was intended for the employees of the estate it was used by some in the town. From the 1870s Reibey himself conducted some of the services in this chapel. The Uniting Church building in Hadspen's main street is a small, weatherboard colonial church. There was a Wesleyan chapel in the town by at least 1852 as well as another small church. In July 1874 the current Uniting church building was completed as a Wesleyan Chapel, that by 1924 was part of the Methodist church. The grounds the church is on were owned by the Wesleyans as early as 1865.

Schools
In 1845, local members of the Church of England, as part of a petition calling for funding, stated that they had established a new school. By 1848 there was also a Wesleyan Sunday School with 20 students. By 1867 there was a secular state school in the town, though funding was inconstant and the school was closed for at least the next two years. This school never grew large; as of 1903 it had an average attendance of 20 students.

The school was still operating in 1937, though a public request had been made for regular transport to take children to the Hagley District School, in consequence of the Hadspen school's impending closure. Children from the town began attending the Hagley school in March 1938. By the middle of the same year a tender was approved by the Minister of Education for regular school transport. The transport was also for students from nearby Carrick., whose school closed in the 1930s. The school building was finally removed; a tender in 1944 called for it to be removed and re-erected at Falmouth. Schools have also been run in other town buildings, including a hall near the Anglican church, that was used for worship before the church's completion, in what is now the Uniting Church and also in another building that later became a private home. In the 21st century there are no schools remaining in Hadspen.

Demographics
Hadspen was a small town for most of its early life; its population in 1966 was 311. It grew quickly from the 1970s to the 1990s after subdivisions were developed in South Esk Drive and Roebourne Avenue. Over this period the population doubled. The population grew from 1,334 in 1991, to 1,848 in 2001, 1,926 in 2006, and 2,063 in the last census results in 2011. Within the town's current footprint its population is expected to reach 2,155 by 2016. The Meander Valley Council, in a March 2011 development plan, forecast Hadspen's population doubling over the subsequent two decades.

The town's population is almost entirely Australian-born; over 90% as of 2011 compared to the average for all Australia of less than 69%. In almost all (96.9%) of homes only English is spoken, again a contrast to the Australian average of 76.8%. Median income is slightly higher than the country's average and the unemployment rate is slightly lower.

Transport
Hadspen was an important stop on the coach route from Launceston to Deloraine from at least the 1840s. The coach service declined from when rail transport started in Tasmania in the late 1860s. The State Government began operating a school bus from town, to Hagley, in the 1930s. Meander Valley Highway, formerly known as Bass Highway, passes through the edge of the town bypassing the old main street. Bass Highway, which connects Launceston, Burnie and Devonport, branches off from this east of the town at Travellers Rest and passes south of Hadspen.

In the 21st century the town has three bus services: Redline Coaches runs a daily school bus service that passes through Hadspen to many of the Schools in and around Launceston; Westbus, another private company, takes students to Hagley Farm School and onwards to Westbury Primary School; Metro Tasmania's public bus service connects Hadspen and the Rutherglen Holiday Village to the centre of Launceston.

Sport
Cricket has been played in Hadspen, at Entally and grounds nearer the town's centre, since at least the 1860s. The cricket oval at Entally was one of the first in Australia and was hosting matches before Melbourne's foundation. During his side's 1874 tour of Australia the great English cricketer W. G. Grace played on the ground. Aside from cricket Entally's grounds were often open for picnics and grand annual events. The Hadspen Chieftains cricket club was formed in the 1987–88 season and plays as part of the Northern Tasmania Cricket Association. They won the association's A grade premiership in the 1991–92 and 1993–94 seasons, and the Charltons Cup Premiership—a combined competition with the North East Cricket Association—in the 1993–94 and 1994–95 seasons.

Entally house has been associated with horse racing though the activities of Thomas Riebey. For a while there was horse racing at Entally Park itself, and ninety horses were raced from Entally's stable. Two of these won wide acclaim: Stockwell was second in the Melbourne Cup and won the Carrick plate in 1881; Malua, stated by the Sydney Bulletin to be the "greatest horse of all time", won the Melbourne cup in 1884, though this was after his time at Entally.

Heritage properties
Hadspen has buildings that are largely intact from colonial times, some of which date from the early parts of the 19th century. The Red Feather inn, an adjacent convict era gaol and four cottages form a cluster of heritage buildings in the midst of the town. The gaol is a sandstone structure that was used to overnight convicts. The inn, gaol and watchmans's cottage, St Andrew's church and Entally House are all listed on the Tasmanian Heritage Register, a recognition of their "historic cultural heritage significance to the whole of Tasmania".

Entally House 

Entally house is a heritage listed property on the western bank of the South Esk River. It, and the buildings of Rutherglen Holiday Village, are the only part of the town on this side. The buildings are filled with indicative furniture and art of their time, including carriages and coaches in the coach house.

Thomas Reibey had been in service with the East India Company when he met his wife Mary Haydock. He formed a trading company in Sydney and named its building "Entally House" after a suburb of Calcutta, India. Trading also brought his sons, Thomas Haydock and James, to Tasmania in the early 19th century. By 1816 James owned land near Hadspen and he purchased more in the 1820s. Thomas Haydock and Mary, his mother, purchased  in 1818 in the then District of Cornwall, encompassing the present day site of Entally, and Thomas Haydock built the initial house in 1819. The original building was apparently a single storey structure, its two square towers arrayed with defensive musket slots. It has been significantly extended and surrounded by outbuildings since.

This latter Reibey was a leading figure in the Anglican Church in the area, and became later Premier of Tasmania. He built a private chapel at Entally, with wooden furnishings and an organ. He is remembered as having a great interest in horse racing and hunting; deer and horses were bred at Entally. At least 90 horses were raced from Entally's stables over time including the famous "Stockwell" and Malua. By 1883, the library was reported as the most extensive in the colony. Entally's lawn was used often for picnics and cricket matches. In the 1930s Rutherglen, now on the opposite side of the Meander Valley Highway, was part of Entally estate. It was home to some 300, ninety-year-old hazelnut trees that were under investigation regarding the prospect of growing Hazelnuts in Australia for Cadbury chocolate production.

On Reibey's death in February 1912 the property passed to his Nephew—Thomas Reibey Arthur—as Reibey had no children, and by 1929 the property was no longer in family hands. In December 1948, after two years of negotiation, the land and buildings were acquired by the Scenery Preservation Board. The property was reserved as a "historic site", more for its heritage value as a colonial home than its association with Reibey. Since then the house has been restored and filled with furniture, though not to original form, but rather as a facsimile of a wealthy 19th century colonial settler's estate. Management of the site moved to the National Parks and Wildlife Service at its formation in Nov 1971. The State Government took over management in 2004, due to the expense of upkeep and concern over the property's condition. Timber company Gunns was by 2005 looking at managing the property and planting 5–6 hectares of premium wine grapes. They leased it from 2005 partly to showcase wine, though the property remained open for visitors. In late 2010 Gunns handed management and control of the property back to the State Government and from then it was maintained by volunteers. Youth Futures, an employment training organisation, was given the task of managing the now established vineyard.

Church of the Good Shepherd

An Anglican church was planned for Hadspen in the late 1850s. Thomas Reibey had WG & E Habershon of London draw up plans in 1857. The building's design was based on St Mary's parish church, Lutterworth, England. It was designed in an early English style with blue ironstone walls, and freestone dressing and reliefs. The foundation stone of "The new Episcopalian Church" or "The Reibey Church" was laid on 23 December 1868. Construction, estimated to cost 1000 pounds, began with locally sourced stonework by Robert Sleightholm, whom Reibey met on a ship from England.

Reibey was funding all of the construction costs. When the structure was mostly complete a scandal erupted around him. He was alleged to have indecently dealt with a married woman. Her husband raised the issue with the bishop, then in 1870 with no action by the Church again with the Church of England Synod in England. Reibey subsequently took libel action but his complaint was dismissed and the Jury largely held that the allegations against him were true. Apart from these allegations, Reibey's wife's health had been declining, his property had been declining in value, and he wrote that he had been considering relinquishing the Archdeaconship for a while. After only a few years the lack of funds provided left only one person working on the site. All work ceased in 1870, by which time the walls were unfinished and the building still lacked a roof. Though the church was incomplete both Reibey and his wife Catherine were buried in a graveyard at the building's rear.

The church remained incomplete for over ninety years. By 1957 Anglican services were being held in St Stephens, a wooden church next to the apparent ruin. Around this time some in the church showed interest in completion of the old structure, partly due to the approaching centenary of construction beginning. In April of that year a gathering of people from the Parish of Carrick was held in the unfinished building, and a prayer held to bless its completion. The gathering, and associated committee, were led and chaired by W R Barrett, assistant bishop of Tasmania.

The original architects' plans had been preserved—though they were close to disintegration—and were largely followed in the subsequent construction work. A Launceston builder was contracted for the work, though much, including flooring, was performed by volunteers. Work was completed at an approximate cost of 8000 pounds, and the church was finally completed on 20 May 1961, with the first service held the following day. Some furnishings in the church came from Entally's Chapel including the altar and coverings, a wooden cross, symbolic paintings and a bell now hung in the church's porch. The bell, formerly in St Stephens in Smithton, carries the inscription "Kains 1817" and probably comes from the whaler "Kains" which was wrecked in 1835. A stained glass window at the rear of the church originated in Entally's chapel, and spent time installed in another nearby Church. It shows the crucifixion of Jesus and the Good Shepherd. The Church is a Gothic Revival design and somewhat scaled down from the original plans, the nave was built  shorter, with some changed elements such as the entrance being built in stone on the west side rather than wood on the south. The church was consecrated in February 1973.

Red Feather Inn
The Red Feather Inn is a heritage listed building in Hadspen's main street. It was built as a coaching inn and in the 21st century has been used for a restaurant and accommodation. The building's frontage is a substantial sandstone single-storey building. Land falls away sharply from the street and the building's rear has two-storeys. Rising affluence in the 1840s had enabled growth of the coach transport industry. It was built, starting in 1842, for local police magistrate Charles Arthur. It was built by John Sprunt, also builder of Macquarie House in Launceston's civic square, using convict hewn sandstone blocks.

The inn was first licensed in 1844 and was at first successful. In only a few decades its fortunes declined when a rail line was built from Launceston, reaching nearby Carrick in 1869. The economy of rail transport took goods and passengers away, forcing wagons from the road. This reduced the demand for coaching inns, and led to a general decline in traffic through and business in the town. As of 2004 it was run as a restaurant and, after a 2008 refurbishment, has been used for accommodation and a cooking school.

Bridges

Flooding of the South Esk River and the need for a river crossing have constrained transport in the town for much of its history. The South Esk, now crossed by a bridge on the Meander Valley Highway, separates the town from settlements further west and unusually high floods can cut the highway on the town's east, when it is submerged at Beams Hollow. The river was first crossed by a ford known as "Reibey's Ford" near Entally House. Due to the variability in its flow this ford was frequently impassable requiring traffic to make significant detours. Thomas Haydock Reibey installed a punt at the crossing in 1828. By a specially passed Government act he was allowed to charge a toll for its use.

Tenders were called for in 1836 for design and construction of a bridge at the village of Hadspen. Five years later the colony's government passed "Reibey's ford act" to facilitate construction of a bridge. The act specified that of the £1500 cost for the bridge, £500 was to be paid by the government, and the remainder by Thomas Haydock Reibey. To recover the costs Reibey was allowed to charge a toll, assisted by a toll house and by turnpikes at the bridge's ends. On construction the toll was mandated as 1d per person, 1s per wagon or carriage, 4d per unladen beast and 1/2d per calf, sheep, pig or lamb. The elder Reibey died before the bridge was completed and his son and executor Thomas Reibey acquired his father's rights, collecting the tolls after the bridge was completed. The toll was to run for the lesser of 30 years, or whatever time it took to pay for the original bridge construction costs plus an annual 15% interest. The wooden bridge was completed by November 1843, and within a little over a year the tolls had raised 453 pounds. It was known as "Reibey's Bridge" and was narrow—fitting only a single wagon—with a single chain each side for safety, a fact that caused the loss of at least one valuable horse. 

The bridge became noted for its insecure state, the lack of rails a particular issue, and it was referred to as "dangerous and unsightly". A new bridge,  higher than the one it replaced, was under construction in 1878.

By 1911 the river was crossed, on the same site, with a steel bridge. This new structure had concrete buttresses and a wooden roadway. The bridge was repaired later in the year and stood for another half century. Over time, particularly after floods, there were calls for the bridge to be raised, though the expense of the work—and the only occasional nature of flooding—was cited in defence of the bridge's adequacy. When the river flooded the bridge, it also often flooded Beams Ford on the other side of Hadspen, temporarily cutting off all road access to the town.
 
The Minister for Land and Works had approved work on raising it in 1939, but this was postponed indefinitely due to World War II. Raising or renewal of the bridge was again being investigated in 1946. The river again flooded over the bridge in July 1952, the first time since the mid-1940s, and the timber deck was still being repaired into 1953. The last and latest bridge was constructed as part of a bypass of the centre of Hadspen. By 1978, the Bass Highway crossed the river further upstream and the old main road was no longer a through road.

Today's town

Hadspen is a small town that functions as a "dormitory suburb", an extension of the Launceston metropolitan area. Entally House lies on the Town's west, across the river. The town has a small shopping centre with a post office and service station, adjacent to a large caravan and cabin park. Development has been almost entirely residential and mostly on the northern side of Meander Valley Highway. Over  of land was already zoned for development within the town boundary as of 2005, and the council plans to allow further expansion on the Highway's south. A 1978 study looked at various areas around Hadspen for development, the only area to date where this has happened is the small expansion of the town south of the Highway on the river's east bank.

The town is in the Meander Valley Council local government area, both the federal and state electoral Division of Bass, and the Tasmanian Legislative Council electoral division of Western Tiers.

Hadspen has grown without any area set aside for small commercial operations, a fact that has led to just a single shopping complex. There was another service station, in the main street, but it closed in 2008 after operating for approximately forty years. Rutherglen is a holiday village, conference and event centre, and retirement village on the town's west. It is the only premises in Hadspen with a general liquor licence. Rutherglen, or a similarly named premises at the same location, has been used for accommodation since at least 1923. The town has access to reticulated water and sewerage. The town's sewerage has been, since the mid-1970s, processed at a plant near Carrick that also serves that town. Treated waste-water from there is discharged into a tributary of the Liffey River.

Notes

References

Bibliography

External links

Localities of Meander Valley Council
1866 establishments in Australia